Hubert Houben (24 February 1898 – 9 November 1956) was a German sprinter who competed at the 1928 Summer Olympics. He won a silver medal in the 4 × 100 m relay, together with Georg Lammers, Richard Corts and Helmut Körnig, and failed to reach the final of individual 100 m event.

Houben played football and trained in gymnastics and swimming before changing to sprint running. On 16 August 1924 he won the 100 m event at the Germany-United States meet, defeating Olympic champions Loren Murchison and Charley Paddock. He missed the 1924 Olympics, as Germany was banned from those Games because of its role in World War I. In the 4 × 100 m relay final at the 1928 Olympics the German team was leading the race, but Houben and Körnig had to slow down to avoid a faulty exchange. That relay team set a world record later in 1928. Houben did not compete at the 1936 Olympics, but was invited as a guest of honor.

During his career Houben won 9 national sprint titles and set 10 world and 14 European records. He took jobs of a bank employer, sports journalist, and a city hall official, and also ran his sporting goods shop. He died from throat cancer aged 58. The Hubert-Houben-Arena in Krefeld and the Hubert-Houben-Stadium in Goch carry his name.

References

1898 births
1956 deaths
German male sprinters
Olympic silver medalists for Germany
Athletes (track and field) at the 1928 Summer Olympics
Olympic athletes of Germany
People from Goch
Sportspeople from Düsseldorf (region)
Medalists at the 1928 Summer Olympics
Olympic silver medalists in athletics (track and field)